The Ohio River is a  long river in the United States. It is located at the boundary of the Midwestern and Southern United States, flowing in a southwesterly direction from western Pennsylvania to its mouth on the Mississippi River at the southern tip of Illinois. It is the third largest river by discharge volume in the United States and the largest tributary by volume of the north-south flowing Mississippi River that divides the eastern from western United States. It is also the 6th oldest river on the North American continent. The river flows through or along the border of six states, and its drainage basin includes parts of 14 states. Through its largest tributary, the Tennessee River, the basin includes several states of the southeastern U.S. It is the source of drinking water for five million people.

The lower Ohio River just below Louisville is obstructed by rapids known as the Falls of the Ohio where the elevation falls  in  restricting larger commercial navigation, although in the 18th and early 19th century its three deepest channels could be traversed by a wide variety of craft then in use. In 1830, the Louisville and Portland Canal (now the McAlpine Locks and Dam) bypassed the rapids, allowing even larger commercial and modern navigation from the Forks of the Ohio at Pittsburgh to the Port of New Orleans at the mouth of the Mississippi on the Gulf of Mexico.

The name "Ohio" comes from the Seneca, lit. "Good River". In his Notes on the State of Virginia published in 1781–82, Thomas Jefferson stated: "The Ohio is the most beautiful river on earth. Its current gentle, waters clear, and bosom smooth and unbroken by rocks and rapids, a single instance only excepted" (though Jefferson himself had not seen the Ohio) In the late 18th century, the river was the southern boundary of the Northwest Territory. It became a primary transportation route for pioneers during the westward expansion of the early U.S. Today, the Ohio River is one of the most polluted rivers in the United States.

The river is sometimes considered as the western extension of the Mason–Dixon Line that divided Pennsylvania from Maryland, and thus part of the border between free and slave territory, and between the Northern and Southern United States or Upper South. Where the river was narrow, it was crossed by thousands of slaves escaping to the North for freedom; many were helped by free blacks and whites of the Underground Railroad resistance movement.

The Ohio River is a climatic transition area, as its water runs along the periphery of the humid subtropical and humid continental climate areas. It is inhabited by fauna and flora of both climates. In winter, it regularly freezes over at Pittsburgh but rarely farther south toward Cincinnati and Louisville. Further down the river in places like Paducah and Owensboro, Kentucky, closer to its confluence with the Mississippi, the Ohio is ice-free year-round.

Etymology
"Great river" and "large creek" have also been given as translations.

Similarly, the Geographic Names Information System lists O-hee-yo and O-hi-o as variant names for the Allegheny.

An earlier Miami-Illinois language name was also applied to the Ohio River,  ("river of the Mosopelea" tribe). Originally applied just to the Ohio River, the "Pelisipi" name later was variously applied back and forth between the Ohio River and the Clinch River in Virginia and Tennessee. In his original draft of the Land Ordinance of 1784, Thomas Jefferson proposed a new state called "Pelisipia", to the south of the Ohio River, which would have included parts of present-day Eastern Kentucky, Virginia and West Virginia.

History

Precolumbian

The river had great significance in the history of the Native Americans, as numerous prehistoric and historic civilizations formed along its valley. For thousands of years, Native Americans used the river as a major transportation and trading route. Its waters connected communities.

In the five centuries before European colonization, the Mississippian culture built numerous regional chiefdoms and major earthwork mounds in the Ohio Valley like the Angel Mounds near Evansville, Indiana as well as in the Mississippi Valley and the Southeast. The historic Osage, Omaha, Ponca, and Kaw peoples lived in the Ohio Valley. Under pressure over the fur trade from the Iroquois nations to the northeast, they migrated west of the Mississippi River in the 17th century to the territory now defined as Missouri, Arkansas, and Oklahoma.

European discovery
Several accounts exist of the discovery and traversal of the Ohio River by Europeans in the latter half of the 17th century: Virginian colonist Abraham Wood's trans-Appalachian expeditions between 1654 and 1664; Frenchman Robert de La Salle's putative Ohio expedition of 1669; and two expeditions of Virginians sponsored by Colonel Wood: the Batts and Fallam expedition of 1671, and the Needham and Arthur expedition of 1673-74. The first known European to traverse the length of the river, from the headwaters of the Allegheny to its mouth on the Mississippi, was a Dutchman from New York, Arnout Viele, in 1692.

Exploration and settlement
In 1749, the Ohio Company was established in the Thirteen Colonies to settle and trade in the Ohio River region. Exploration of the territory and trade with the Indians in the region near the Forks brought white colonists from both Pennsylvania and Virginia across the mountains, and both colonies claimed the territory. The movement across the Allegheny Mountains of Anglo-American settlers and the claims of the area near modern-day Pittsburgh led to conflict with the French, who had forts in the Ohio River Valley. This conflict was called the French and Indian War, and would merge into the global Anglo-French struggle, the Seven Years' War. In 1763, following its defeat in the war, France ceded its area east of the Mississippi River to Britain and its area west of the Mississippi River to Spain in the 1763 Treaty of Paris.

The 1768 Treaty of Fort Stanwix with several tribes opened Kentucky to colonial settlement and established the Ohio River as a southern boundary for American Indian territory. In 1774 the Quebec Act restored the land east of the Mississippi River and north of the Ohio River to Quebec, in effect making the Ohio the southern boundary of Canada. This appeased French Canadians in Quebec but angered the colonists of the Thirteen Colonies. Lord Dunmore's War south of the Ohio river also contributed to cession of land north to Quebec to prevent colonial expansion onto Native American territory. During the Revolutionary War. in 1776 the British military engineer John Montrésor created a map of the river showing the strategic location of Fort Pitt, including specific navigational information about the Ohio River's rapids and tributaries in that area. However, the 1783 Treaty of Paris gave the entire Ohio Valley to the United States, and numerous white settlers entered the region.

The economic connection of the Ohio Country to the East was significantly increased in 1818 when the National Road being built westward from Cumberland, Maryland, reached Wheeling, Virginia, (now West Virginia), providing an easier overland connection from the Potomac River to the Ohio River. The Wheeling Suspension Bridge was built over the river at Wheeling from 1847 to 1849, making the trip west easier. For a brief time, until 1851, it was the world's largest suspension bridge. The bridge survived the American Civil War, after having been improved in 1859. It was renovated again in 1872, and remains in use as the oldest vehicular suspension bridge in the U.S.

Louisville was founded in 1779 at the only major natural navigational barrier on the river, the Falls of the Ohio. In this area, the river flowed over hard, fossil-rich beds of limestone. The first locks on the river  the Louisville and Portland Canal  were built between 1825 and 1830 to circumnavigate the falls. Fears that Louisville's transshipment industry would collapse proved ill-founded: but the increasing size of steamships and barges on the river meant that the outdated locks could serve only the smallest vessels until well after the Civil War when improvements were made. The U.S. Army Corps of Engineers improvements were expanded again in the 1960s, forming the present-day McAlpine Locks and Dam.

Nineteenth century
During the nineteenth century, emigrants from Virginia, North Carolina and Kentucky traveled by the river and settled along its northern bank. Known as butternuts, they formed the dominant culture in the southern portions of Ohio, Indiana and Illinois with a society that was primarily Southern in culture. Largely devoted to agricultural pursuits, they shipped much of their produce along the river to ports such as Cincinnati.

Because the Ohio River flowed westward, it became a convenient means of westward movement by pioneers traveling from western Pennsylvania. After reaching the mouth of the Ohio, settlers would travel north on the Mississippi River to St. Louis, Missouri. There, some continued on up the Missouri River, some up the Mississippi, and some farther west over land routes. In the early 19th century, river pirates such as Samuel Mason, operating out of Cave-In-Rock, Illinois, waylaid travelers on their way down the river. They killed travelers, stealing their goods and scuttling their boats. The folktales about Mike Fink recall the keelboats used for commerce in the early days of American settlement. The Ohio River boatmen inspired performer Dan Emmett, who in 1843 wrote the song "The Boatman's Dance".

Trading boats and ships traveled south on the Mississippi to New Orleans, and sometimes beyond to the Gulf of Mexico and other ports in the Americas and Europe. This provided a much-needed export route for goods from the west since the trek east over the Appalachian Mountains was long and arduous. The need for access to the port of New Orleans by settlers in the Ohio Valley is one of the factors that led to the United States' Louisiana Purchase in 1803.

Free states border
Because the river is the southern border of Ohio, Indiana, and Illinois, it was part of the border between free states and slave states in the years before the American Civil War. The expression "sold down the river" originated as a lament of Upper South slaves, especially from Kentucky, who were shipped via the Ohio and Mississippi to cotton and sugar plantations in the Deep South. Changes in crops cultivated in the Upper South resulted in slaves available to be sold to the South, where the expansion of cotton plantations was doing very well. Invention of the cotton gin made cultivation of short-staple cotton profitable throughout the Black Belt of this region.

Before and during the Civil War, the Ohio River was called the "River Jordan" by slaves crossing it to escape to freedom in the North via the Underground Railroad. More escaping slaves, estimated in the thousands, made their perilous journey north to freedom across the Ohio River than anywhere else across the north-south frontier. Harriet Beecher Stowe's Uncle Tom's Cabin, the bestselling novel that fueled abolitionist work, was the best known of the anti-slavery novels that portrayed such escapes across the Ohio. The times have been expressed by 20th-century novelists as well, such as the Nobel Prize-winning Toni Morrison, whose novel Beloved was adapted as a film of the same name. She also composed the libretto for the opera Margaret Garner (2005), based on the life and trial of an enslaved woman who escaped with her family across the river.

State border dispute
The colonial charter for Virginia defined its territory as extending to the north shore of the Ohio, so that the riverbed was "owned" by Virginia. Where the river serves as a boundary between states today, Congress designated the entire river to belong to the states on the east and south, i.e., West Virginia and Kentucky at the time of admission to the Union, that were divided from Virginia. Thus Wheeling Island, the largest inhabited island in the Ohio River, belongs to West Virginia, although it is closer to the Ohio shore than to the West Virginia shore. Kentucky sued the state of Indiana in the early 1980s because of their construction of the never-completed Marble Hill Nuclear Power Plant in Indiana, which would have discharged its waste water into the river. This would have adversely affected Kentucky's water supplies.

The U.S. Supreme Court held that Kentucky's jurisdiction (and, implicitly, that of West Virginia) extended only to the low-water mark of 1793 (important because the river has been extensively dammed for navigation so that the present river bank is north of the old low-water mark.)  Similarly, in the 1990s, Kentucky challenged Illinois's right to collect taxes on a riverboat casino docked in Metropolis, citing its own control of the entire river. A private casino riverboat that docked in Evansville, Indiana, on the Ohio River opened about the same time. Although such boats cruised on the Ohio River in an oval pattern up and down, the state of Kentucky soon protested. Other states had to limit their cruises to going forward, then reversing and going backward on the Indiana shore only. Both Illinois and Indiana have long since changed their laws to allow riverboat casinos to be permanently docked, with Illinois changing in 1999 and Indiana in 2002.

Bridge collapse

The Silver Bridge at Point Pleasant, West Virginia collapsed into the river on December 15, 1967. The collapse killed 46 people who had been crossing when the bridge failed. The bridge had been built in 1929, and by 1967 was carrying too heavy a load for its design. The bridge was rebuilt about one mile downstream and in service as the Silver Memorial Bridge in 1969.

Conservation area
In the early 1980s, the Falls of the Ohio National Wildlife Conservation Area was established at Clarksville, Indiana.

Ecology

The Ohio River as a whole is ranked as the most polluted river in the United States, based on 2009 and 2010 data. The more industrial and regional West Virginia/Pennsylvania tributary, the Monongahela River, ranked 17th for water pollution, behind 16 other American rivers. The Ohio again ranked as the most polluted in 2013, and has been the most polluted river since at least 2001, according to the Ohio River Valley Water Sanitation Commission (ORSANCO). The Commission found that 92% of toxic discharges were nitrates, including farm runoff and waste water from industrial processes such as steel production. The Commission also noted mercury pollution as an ongoing concern, citing a 500% increase in mercury discharges between 2007 and 2013.

For several decades beginning in the 1950s, the Ohio River was polluted with hundreds of thousands of pounds of PFOA, a fluoride-based chemical used in making teflon, among other things, by the DuPont chemical company from an outflow pipe at its Parkersburg, West Virginia, facility.

Economy
The Ohio River is extensively industrialized and populated. Regular barge traffic carries cargoes of oil, steel and other industrial goods produced in the region. Major cities located along the northern and southern banks of the river include Pittsburgh, Pennsylvania; Louisville, Kentucky; Evansville, Indiana; and Cincinnati, Ohio.

Geography and hydrography

The Indians and early European explorers and settlers of the region often considered the Allegheny to be part of the Ohio. The forks (the confluence of the Allegheny and Monongahela rivers at what is now Pittsburgh) were considered a strategic military location by colonial French and British, and later independent American military authorities.

The Ohio River is formed by the confluence of the Allegheny and Monongahela rivers at what is now Point State Park in Pittsburgh, Pennsylvania. From there, it flows northwest through Allegheny and Beaver counties, before making an abrupt turn to the south-southwest at the West Virginia–Ohio–Pennsylvania triple-state line (near East Liverpool, Ohio; Chester, West Virginia; and Ohioville, Pennsylvania). From there, it forms the border between West Virginia and Ohio, upstream of Wheeling, West Virginia.

The river follows a roughly southwest and then west-northwest course until Cincinnati, before bending to a west-southwest course for most of the remainder of its length. The course forms the northern borders of West Virginia and Kentucky; and the southern borders of Ohio, Indiana and Illinois, until it joins the Mississippi River at the city of Cairo, Illinois.

The Mississippi River flows to the Gulf of Mexico on the Atlantic Ocean. Among rivers wholly or mostly in the United States, the Ohio is the second largest by discharge volume and the tenth longest and has the eighth largest drainage basin. It serves to separate the Midwestern Great Lakes states from the Upper South states, which were historically border states in the Civil War.

The Ohio River is a left (east) and the largest tributary by volume of the Mississippi River in the United States. At the confluence, the Ohio is considerably bigger than the Mississippi, measured by long-term mean discharge. The Ohio River at Cairo is 281,500 cu ft/s (7,960 m3/s); and the Mississippi River at Thebes, Illinois, which is upstream of the confluence, is 208,200 cu ft/s (5,897 m3/s). The Ohio River flow is greater than that of the Mississippi River, so hydrologically the Ohio River is the main stream of the river system.

River depth

The Ohio River is a naturally shallow river that was artificially deepened by a series of dams. The dams raise the water level and have turned the river largely into a series of reservoirs, eliminating shallow stretches and allowing for commercial navigation. The largest immediate drop in water level is below the McAlpine Locks and Dam at the Falls of the Ohio at Louisville, Kentucky, where flood stage is reached when the water reaches  on the lower gauge.

Water levels for the Ohio River from Smithland Lock and Dam upstream to Pittsburgh are predicted daily by the National Oceanic and Atmospheric Administration's Ohio River Forecast Center. The water depth predictions are relative to each local flood plain based upon predicted rainfall in the Ohio River basin in five reports as follows:

 Pittsburgh, Pennsylvania, to Hannibal Locks and Dam, Ohio (including the Allegheny and Monongahela rivers)
 Willow Island Locks and Dam, Ohio, to Greenup Lock and Dam, Kentucky (including the Kanawha River)
 Portsmouth, Ohio, to Markland Locks and Dam, Kentucky
 McAlpine Locks and Dam, Kentucky, to Cannelton Locks and Dam, Indiana
 Newburgh Lock and Dam, Indiana, to Golconda, Illinois
The water levels for the Ohio River from Smithland Lock and Dam to Cairo, Illinois, are predicted by the National Oceanic and Atmospheric Administration's Lower Mississippi River Forecast Center.
 Smithland Lock and Dam, Illinois, to Cairo, Illinois

List of major tributaries
The largest tributaries of the Ohio by discharge volume are:

Tennessee River /sec
Cumberland River /sec
Wabash River /sec
Allegheny River /sec
Kanawha River /sec

Green River /sec
Monongahela River /sec
Kentucky River /sec
Muskingum River /sec
Scioto River /sec

By drainage basin area, the largest tributaries are:

Tennessee River 
Wabash River 
Cumberland River 
Kanawha River 
Allegheny River 

Green River 
Muskingum River 
Monongahela River 
Kentucky River 
Scioto River 

The largest tributaries by length are:

Cumberland River 
Tennessee River 
Wabash River 
Green River 
Allegheny River 

Licking River .
Kentucky River 
Scioto River 
Great Miami River
Little Kanawha River 

Major tributaries of the river, in order from the head to the mouth of the Ohio, include:

 Allegheny River – Pittsburgh, Pennsylvania
 Monongahela River – Pittsburgh
 Saw Mill Run – Pittsburgh
 Chartiers Creek – Pittsburgh
 Montour Run – Coraopolis, Pennsylvania
 Beaver River – Rochester, Pennsylvania
 Breezewood Creek – Beaver, Pennsylvania
 Raccoon Creek – Center Township, Pennsylvania
 Little Beaver Creek – East Liverpool, Ohio
 Wheeling Creek – Wheeling, West Virginia
 Middle Island Creek – St. Marys, West Virginia
 Little Muskingum River – Ohio
 Duck Creek – Marietta, Ohio
 Muskingum River – Marietta, Ohio
 Little Kanawha River – Parkersburg, West Virginia
 Hocking River – Hockingport, Ohio
 Kanawha River – Point Pleasant, West Virginia
 Guyandotte River – Huntington, West Virginia

 Big Sandy River – Kentucky-West Virginia border
 Little Sandy River – Greenup, Kentucky
 Little Scioto River – Sciotoville, Ohio
 Scioto River – Portsmouth, Ohio
 Kinniconick Creek – Vanceburg, Kentucky
 Little Miami River – Cincinnati, Ohio
 Licking River – Newport-Covington, Kentucky
 Mill Creek – Cincinnati, Ohio
 Great Miami River – Ohio-Indiana border
 Kentucky River – Carrollton, Kentucky
 Salt River – West Point, Kentucky
 Green River – near Henderson, Kentucky
 Wabash River – Indiana-Illinois-Kentucky border
 Saline River – Illinois
 Cumberland River – Smithland, Kentucky
 Tennessee River – Paducah, Kentucky
 Cache River – Illinois

Drainage basin
The Ohio drains parts of 14 states in four regions.

 Northeast
 New York: a small area of the southern border along the headwaters of the Allegheny.
 Pennsylvania: a corridor from the southwestern corner to the north-central border.
 Mid-Atlantic/Upper South
 Maryland: a small corridor along the Youghiogheny River on the western border.
 West Virginia: all but the Eastern Panhandle.
 Kentucky: all but a small part in the extreme west drained directly by the Mississippi.
 Tennessee: all but a small part in the extreme west drained directly by the Mississippi, and a very small area in the southeastern corner which is drained by the Conasauga River.
 Virginia: most of southwest Virginia.
 North Carolina: the western quarter.
 Midwest
 Ohio: 80% (all except a northern strip bordering Lake Erie, and the northwest corner)
 Indiana: all but the northern area.
 Illinois: the southeast quarter.
 Deep South
 Georgia: the far northwest corner.
 Alabama: the northern portion.
 Mississippi: the northeast corner.

Climate transition zone
The Ohio River is a climatic transition area, as its water runs along the periphery of the humid continental and humid subtropical climate areas. It is inhabited by fauna and flora of both climates. In winter, it regularly freezes over at Pittsburgh but rarely farther south toward Cincinnati and Louisville. At Paducah, Kentucky, in the south, at the Ohio's confluence with the Tennessee River, it is ice-free year-round.

In the 21st century, with the 2016 update of climate zones, the humid subtropical zone has stretched across the river, into the southern portions of Ohio, Indiana, and Illinois.

Geology

From a geological standpoint, the Ohio River is young. Before the river was created, large parts of North America were covered by water forming a saltwater lake about 200 miles across and 400 miles in length. The bedrock of the Ohio Valley was mostly set during this time. The river formed on a piecemeal basis beginning between 2.5 and 3 million years ago. By the movement of glaciers during the earliest ice ages, the contemporary river drainages of the Kanawha, Sandy, Kentucky, Green, Cumberland and Tennessee rivers northward created the Ohio system and the course of early tributaries of the Ohio River, including the Monongahela and the Allegheny rivers, were set. The Teays River was the largest of these rivers. The modern Ohio River flows within segments of the ancient Teays. The ancient rivers were rearranged or consumed.

The section of the river that runs southwest from Pittsburgh to Cairo, Illinois is around tens of thousands of years old.

Upper Ohio River
The upper Ohio River formed when one of the glacial lakes overflowed into a south-flowing tributary of the Teays River. Prior to that event, the north-flowing Steubenville River (no longer in existence) ended between New Martinsville and Paden City, West Virginia. The south-flowing Marietta River (no longer in existence) ended between the present-day cities. The overflowing lake carved through the separating hill and connected the rivers. The floodwaters enlarged the small Marietta valley to a size more typical of a large river. The new large river subsequently drained glacial lakes and melting glaciers at the end of the ice ages. The valley grew during and following the ice age. Many small rivers were altered or abandoned after the upper Ohio River formed. Valleys of some abandoned rivers can still be seen on satellite and aerial images of the hills of Ohio and West Virginia between Marietta, Ohio, and Huntington, West Virginia.

Middle Ohio River
The middle Ohio River formed in a manner similar to that of the upper Ohio River. A north-flowing river was temporarily dammed by natural forces southwest of present-day Louisville, creating a large lake until the dam burst. A new route was carved to the Mississippi. Eventually, the upper and middle sections combined to form what is essentially the modern Ohio River.

Cities and towns along the river
Along the banks of the Ohio are some of the largest cities in their respective states: Pittsburgh, the third largest city on the river and second-largest city in Pennsylvania; Cincinnati, the third-largest city in Ohio; Louisville, the largest city on the river and in Kentucky; Evansville, the third-largest city in Indiana; Owensboro, the fourth-largest city in Kentucky; and three of the five largest cities in West Virginia—Huntington (second), Parkersburg (fourth), and Wheeling (fifth). Only Illinois, among the border states, has no significant cities on the river. There are hundreds of other cities, towns, villages and unincorporated populated places on the river, most of them very small.

Cities along the Ohio are also among the oldest cities in their respective states and among the oldest cities in the United States west of the Appalachian Mountains (by date of founding): Old Shawneetown, Illinois, 1748; Pittsburgh, Pennsylvania, 1758; Wheeling, West Virginia, 1769; Huntington, West Virginia, 1775; Louisville, Kentucky, 1779; Clarksville, Indiana, 1783; Maysville, Kentucky, 1784; Martin's Ferry, Ohio, 1785; Marietta, Ohio, 1788; Cincinnati, Ohio, 1788; Manchester, Ohio, 1790; Beaver, Pennsylvania, 1792; and Golconda, Illinois, 1798.

Other cities of interest include Cairo, Illinois, at the confluence of the Ohio with the Mississippi River and the southernmost and westernmost city on the river; and Beaver, Pennsylvania, the site of colonial Fort McIntosh and the northernmost city on the river. It is 548 miles as the crow flies between Cairo and Pittsburgh, but 981 miles by water. Direct water travel over the length of the river is obstructed by the Falls of the Ohio just below Louisville, Kentucky. The Ohio River Scenic Byway follows the Ohio River through Illinois, Indiana and Ohio ending at Steubenville, Ohio, on the river.

Before there were cities, there were colonial forts. These forts played a dominant role in the French and Indian War, Northwest Indian War and pioneering settlement of Ohio Country. Many cities got their start at or adjacent to the forts. Most were abandoned by 1800. Forts along the Ohio river include Fort Pitt (Pennsylvania), Fort McIntosh (Pennsylvania), Fort Randolph (West Virginia), Fort Henry (West Virginia), Fort Harmar (Ohio), Fort Washington (Ohio), and Fort Nelson (Kentucky). Short-lived, special-purpose forts included Fort Steuben (Ohio), Fort Finney (Indiana), Fort Finney (Ohio) and Fort Gower (Ohio).

Gallery

See also 

 Lists of dams and bridges
 List of crossings of the Ohio River
 List of locks and dams of the Ohio River

 Lists of Rivers
 List of variant names of the Ohio River
 List of longest rivers of the United States (by main stem)
 List of rivers of Illinois
 List of rivers of Indiana
 List of rivers of Kentucky
 List of rivers of Ohio
 List of rivers of Pennsylvania
 List of rivers of West Virginia

 Ohio Valley, etc.
 Appalachia
 Appalachian Ohio
 Ohio and Erie Canal
 Ohio River flood of 1937
 Watersheds of Illinois
 Ohio River Valley AVA
 Ohio Valley in Kentucky
 Ohio River Trail
 Ohio River Water Trail
 Falls of the Ohio National Wildlife Conservation Area

Notes

References

Further reading

External links

 Ohio River Flows and Forecasts
 U.S. Geological Survey: PA stream gauging stations
 Ohio River Forecast Center, which issues official river forecasts for the Ohio River and its tributaries from Smithland Lock and Dam upstream
 Lower Mississippi River Forecast Center, which issues official river forecasts for the Ohio River and its tributaries downstream of Smithland Lock and Dam
 

 
Tributaries of the Mississippi River
Rivers of Illinois
Rivers of Indiana
Rivers of Kentucky
Rivers of Ohio
Rivers of Pennsylvania
Rivers of West Virginia
Appalachian Ohio
Borders of Illinois
Borders of Kentucky
Borders of Indiana
Borders of Ohio
Borders of West Virginia
Mississippi River watershed